Galilee Bedouin are Bedouin living in the Galilee region of Northern Israel. In contrast to Negev Bedouin, Galilee Bedouin come from the Syrian desert. As of 2020, there are about 50,000 Galilee Bedouin, living in 28 recognized settlements and also living in mixed cities with other non-Bedouin Arabs.

References 

Bedouins in Israel
Galilee
Northern District (Israel)